The twelfth season of NCIS: Los Angeles, an American police procedural drama television series, began airing on CBS on November 8, 2020, and ended on May 23, 2021. The season included 18 episodes. This is the final season to feature Barrett Foa and Renée Felice Smith as series regulars.

Cast and characters

Main 
 Chris O'Donnell as Grisha "G." Callen, NCIS Supervisory Special Agent (SSA) and Special Agent-in-Charge (SAC) of the Team
 LL Cool J as Sam Hanna, NCIS Senior Field Agent, Second in Command
 Daniela Ruah as Kensi Blye, NCIS Special Agent
 Eric Christian Olsen as Marty Deeks, NCIS Investigator (Previously LAPD/NCIS Liaison Officer)
 Barrett Foa as Eric Beale, NCIS Senior Technical Operator
 Renée Felice Smith as Nell Jones, NCIS Special Agent and Intelligence Analyst & Acting Operations Manager
 Medalion Rahimi as Fatima Namazi, NCIS Special Agent
 Caleb Castille as Devin Roundtree, NCIS Special Agent (Previously FBI Agent)
 Linda Hunt as Henrietta Lange, NCIS Supervisory Special Agent (SSA) and Operations Manager

Recurring
 Bar Paly as Anastasia "Anna" Kolcheck, former ATF Agent, Callen's girlfriend
 Vyto Ruginis as Arkady Kolcheck
 Ravil Isyanov as Anatoli Kirkin
 Gerald McRaney as Hollace Kilbride, Retired Navy Admiral
 Elizabeth Bogush as Joelle Taylor, CIA Agent

Guest Stars
 Marina Khan
Mariela Garriga as Pietra Rey (episode 8)

Episodes

Production

Development and filming 
On May 6, 2020, CBS renewed the series for a twelfth season, which premiered on November 8, 2020. Production for the twelfth season began on September 23, 2020 with full safety protocols in place amid the COVID-19 pandemic.

Casting 
Caleb Castille was promoted to series regular after recurring in season eleven.

Reception

Ratings

Home media

References

External links

2020 American television seasons
2021 American television seasons
12
Television productions postponed due to the COVID-19 pandemic